Hebrews 13 is the thirteenth (and the last) chapter of the Epistle to the Hebrews in the New Testament of the Christian Bible. The author is anonymous, although the internal reference to "our brother Timothy" (Hebrews 13:23), caused a traditional attribution to Paul. This attribution has been disputed since the second century, and there is no decisive evidence for the authorship. This closing chapter contains the author's concluding exhortations, 
final benediction and epistolary postscript.

Text

The original text was written in Koine Greek. This chapter is divided into 25 verses.

Textual witnesses
Some early manuscripts containing the text of this chapter are:
Papyrus 46 (c. 175–225; complete)
Codex Vaticanus (325-350)
Codex Sinaiticus (330-360)
Papyrus 126 (4th century; extant verses 12-13, 19-20)
Codex Alexandrinus (400-440)
Codex Ephraemi Rescriptus (ca. 450; complete)
Codex Freerianus (~450; extant verses 7-9,16-18,23-25)
Codex Claromontanus (~550)
Codex Coislinianus (ca. 550; extant verses 24–25)

Old Testament references
: ; 
:

Concluding Exhortations (13:1–17)

Verse 4
Give honor to marriage, and remain faithful to one another in marriage. God will surely judge people who are immoral and those who commit adultery.

Verse 8
Jesus Christ is the same yesterday, today, and forever.

Verse 12
Therefore Jesus also, that He might sanctify the people with His own blood, suffered outside the gate.

Benediction and Epistolary Postscript (13:18–25)

Verse 23
Know that our brother Timothy has been set free, with whom I shall see you if he comes shortly.
"Timothy": Paul's companion mentioned multiple times in the New Testament, such as in Acts 16–17, 1 Timothy, 2 Timothy, and is known by the recipients of this letter.  
"Set free": can also rendered as "set at liberty" or "dismissed" either from his current duty (sent by the apostle Paul), or released from prison.

See also

 Related Bible parts: Joshua 1, Psalm 102, Psalm 118, John 19

References

Bibliography

External links
 King James Bible - Wikisource
English Translation with Parallel Latin Vulgate
Online Bible at GospelHall.org (ESV, KJV, Darby, American Standard Version, Bible in Basic English)
Multiple bible versions at Bible Gateway (NKJV, NIV, NRSV etc.)

13